William Wood (January 6, 1899 – October 2, 1969) was a Canadian rower who competed in the 1924 Summer Olympics. In 1924, he won the silver medal as crew member of the Canadian boat in the coxless fours event.

References

External links
William Wood's profile at databaseOlympics
William Wood's profile at Sports Reference.com

1899 births
1969 deaths
Canadian male rowers
Olympic rowers of Canada
Olympic silver medalists for Canada
Rowers at the 1924 Summer Olympics
Olympic medalists in rowing
Medalists at the 1924 Summer Olympics